Molla Abdollah School is located in the bazaar of Isfahan, Iran, and was a premises for prayer and theological studies by reputed clergy, including Mullah Abdollah Shooshtari, during the reign of Shah Abbas I of Persia.

Schools in Isfahan